An officious intermeddler is a person who voluntarily, and without request or pre-existing legal duty, interjects him- or herself into the affairs of another, and then seeks remuneration for services or reimbursement. Example: Person "A" leaves for vacation for two weeks during the summer. Person "B" mows "A"s lawn. "B" requests payment for this service. Under common law doctrine, "B" is not entitled to any payment from "A" beyond whatever "A" cares to give. If B tries to coerce payment, B is an officious intermeddler.

Emergencies
An exception to this rule, however, is if a doctor gives medical treatment to an unconscious victim.  Although the unconscious person did not request the doctor's services, a court may deem it reasonable for the doctor to presume that such services would be desired by the person, had they been conscious.

Quasi-contracts
Another exception to this rule, in certain jurisdictions, is the existence of a quasi-contract.  In general, in order for a contract to exist, there must be mutual consent among all parties. In the case of an officious intermeddler, this element of a contract is missing: consideration (goods or services) was provided by one party, but without the mutual consent of the receiving party.  Therefore, no contract was made, and the intermeddler has no legal recourse to claim compensation.  However, certain legal jurisdictions provide for an implied-by-law contract, called a quasi-contract, that exists solely for the purposes of remedying this unjust enrichment by giving a court legal means to enforce compensation.  The distinction between an officious intermeddler, and a party operating under a quasi-contract, is that the recipient of the goods or services has knowingly accepted the goods or services, with the intention of benefiting from them without providing compensation.

References

Citations

Sources 

 Second Restatement of Contracts Sec. 74
 Restatement of Restitution Sec. 2
 Restatement of Restitution Sec. 116
 Black's Law Dictionary

See also 
 Quasi-contract
Implied-in-fact contract

Common law
Contract law
Contract law legal terminology